Globe Hotel or The Globe Hotel may refer to:

Globe Hotel (McDonough, Georgia), listed on the NRHP in Georgia
The Globe Hotel (Spokane, Washington), listed on the NRHP in Spokane County, Washington
Globe Hotel (Baileys Harbor, Wisconsin), listed on the NRHP in Door County, Wisconsin